Dallas: J.R. Returns is a 1996 American made-for-television drama film and is the first of two Dallas reunion films, produced after the series went off the air in 1991. It originally aired on CBS on November 15, 1996, and was rerun as part of TV Land's salute to 50 years of Warner Bros. Television.

Plot summary 
The cliffhanger ending of the 1991 Dallas series finale is resolved; the gunshot J.R. Ewing (Larry Hagman) fired was at the mirror, not himself.

Five years later, J.R. is in Europe, while Bobby Ewing (Patrick Duffy) lives at Southfork Ranch alone with his son Christopher (Christopher Demetral), happily out of the oil business, and Cliff Barnes (Ken Kercheval) now owns Ewing Oil.

Bobby, conscious of the fact that Southfork is now almost empty, considers selling it. Meanwhile, Cliff decides to sell Ewing Oil to WestStar Oil, a giant oil conglomerate headed by J.R.'s other nemesis, Carter McKay (George Kennedy). J.R. hears this and decides to try to regain his position. He appeals to Bobby to get back in business together and buy Ewing Oil back but is rebuffed. J.R. arranges for Afton (Audrey Landers) to be put in a sanitarium so Cliff can't find her.

J.R. learns of a provision in Jock Ewing's will where Jock left J.R.'s son, John Ross (Omri Katz), stock in the computer company Cyberbyte. The provision states that John Ross is only to receive this stock upon the death of his father. Since John Ross is unaware of his inheritance, J.R. decides to sell some of this stock and buy shares to take over WestStar. He sells the stock portfolio and buys a controlling stake in WestStar Oil. To cover his tracks, J.R. rebuys the stock and reinstates the provision, saying that if anyone finds out about the incident, he will claim that they were released to John Ross Ewing Jr. (J.R.) instead of his son (full name John Ross Ewing III) in a clerical error.

To set this in motion, he fakes his death and has his attorney "accidentally" put the shares in his name instead of his son's. Bobby holds a memorial service, with John Ross and Sue Ellen (Linda Gray) attending and Cliff in quiet celebration, believing he's won the ultimate victory over J.R. until J.R. returns to Southfork.  He claims to have been kidnapped and escaped. Sly is disgusted and resigns as J.R.'s assistant.

J.R. is the majority shareholder in WestStar, and he uses that clout to force McKay to back out of buying Ewing Oil. After being sent a letter notifying him of his daughter's whereabouts, Cliff decided that finding his family is more important than beating J.R., but Bobby figured out a way that Cliff can have both, and he bought Ewing Oil.  Bobby later realizes that he was tricked back into the oil business by J.R., who knew getting Bobby off Southfork would force him not to sell. J.R. maneuvered the board to remove McKay as Chairman of WestStar and for himself to take his place.

An unhappy Bobby sells half of the company to his new partner, Sue Ellen. A drunken and bitter Sly (Deborah Rennard) had tipped off Sue Ellen that J.R. faked his own death.  Sue Ellen suspected this all along and felt that J.R needed to be taught a lesson. Cliff, meanwhile, greets Afton and their daughter Pamela (Deborah Kellner) outside the sanitarium, and they leave to be a family.

In the last scene, John Ross asks J.R. why he is smiling even though he lost Ewing Oil to Bobby and Sue Ellen. J.R. points out that Bobby is back in the oil business and is no longer going to sell Southfork. Sue Ellen is back at Southfork to stay, and John Ross will remain in Dallas to learn the oil business from J.R.  John Ross realizes that his father planned everything to work out this way.  J.R.'s last words are, "You see, John Ross? You're learning already."

Ratings
Dallas: J.R. Returns was a ratings success for the CBS Network, and ranked 14th place for the week it was shown, with a 13.4 rating. Its success prompted Warner Bros. to produce a reunion miniseries for the Dallas spin-off series Knots Landing (entitled Knots Landing: Back to the Cul-de-Sac) in 1997. A second Dallas TV movie, War of the Ewings, was produced in 1998.

Continuity
As with War of the Ewings (1998), the events depicted  in J.R. Returns are ignored for the revival series, which premiered on TNT in 2012.

Cast
Starring in alphabetical order
 Rosalind Allen as Julia Cunningham
 Christopher Demetral as Christopher Ewing
 Patrick Duffy as Bobby Ewing
 Linda Gray as Sue Ellen Ewing
 Larry Hagman as J.R. Ewing
 Omri Katz as John Ross Ewing III
 Deborah Kellner as Pamela Rebecca Cooper
 George Kennedy as Carter McKay
 Ken Kercheval as Cliff Barnes
 Audrey Landers as Afton Cooper
 Tracy Scoggins as Anita Smithfield

Guest Stars
 Deborah Rennard as Sly Lovegren
 Buck Taylor as Steve Grisham
 George O. Petrie as Harv Smithfield

DVD release
Warner Home Video released Dallas: J.R. Returns on DVD April 12, 2011 as part of the Dallas: The Movie Collection 2-disc set. It was only available as a region 1 set.

References

External links
 

1996 television films
1996 drama films
1996 films
CBS network films
Films based on television series
Television series reunion films
Films set in Dallas
Dallas (TV franchise) films
Dallas (TV franchise)
Television films based on television series
American drama television films
1990s American films